Karinkunnam 6's is a 2016 Indian Malayalam sports drama film directed by Deepu Karunakaran. It stars Manju Warrier an ex-railway sportswoman who as a volleyball coach trains a group of prisoners portrayed by Babu Antony, Baiju, Padmaraj Ratheesh, Sudev Nair, Sudheer Karamana, Jacob Gregory, and Santhosh Keezhattoor. The musical score and songs are composed by Rahul Raj. The film was released in Kerala on 6 July 2016. The film is a tribute to Jimmy George.

Plot
It's an underdog story of motivated prisoners led by Vandhana and Aby. Aby starts a Volleyball Premier League (VPL) with businessman Mukul Keshav and Kuriyachan. Aby's ego doesn't match with his colleagues. Aby gets injured and is unable to train a team for VPL. His Karinkunnam 6's team players get acquired by Kuriyachan under Golden Smashers. Vandhana fills in for Aby's passion and responsibility and finds a team and attempts to regroup them under her and Aby's banner Karinkunnam 6's but gets snatched up by Felix for Southern Warriors. Disheartened Vandhana tries to recruit a bunch prisoners as their team through IG Haritha. The rest of the film follows how Vandhana and her band of misfits from Poojappura Central Prison are able to win VPL facing slight challenges.

Cast

Manju Warrier as Vandhana, Aby's Wife
Anoop Menon as Aby
Babu Antony as Douglas
Baiju as Lalu
Sudheer Karamana as Sasankan
Sudev Nair as Ikru
Jacob Gregory as Bruno
Padmaraj Ratheesh as Mohsin
Santhosh Keezhattoor as Vasudev
Sreejith Ravi as Barnabas, Prison Warden
Suraj Venjaramoodu as Nelson, Prison Warden
Samuthirakani as Saravanan  
Jagadish as Narayanan, Commentator
Pradeep Kottayam as Bhasi, Vandhana's assistant
Nandhu as Ambootty
Maniyanpilla Raju as Pillai
Shyamaprasad as Mukul Keshav
Vijayakumar as Pranchi
Balaji Sharma as Satheeshan
Manikuttan as Vishnu
Shaji Nadeshan as Kuriyachan
Rony David
Vivek Gopan as Team player
DySP Rajkumar Rajasekharan
Taniya Stanley as Shreya, Ikru's girlfriend
Major Ravi as IG Thobias John IPS
Lena as IG Haritha Krishnan IPS
Hareesh Peradi as Santhosh, Shreya's Father
Asottan Bombay as  Referee
Bindhu Krishna as Vasudev's wife
Ambika Mohan
Gayathri Suresh as Photographer (cameo appearance)

Soundtrack
The songs and score were composed by Rahul Raj. Vinaayak Sasikumar wrote lyrics for the songs. "Ulakathin", the first video song from the film was released by the label Muzik 247 through YouTube on 21 June 2016.
Track listing
 "Ulakathin" (Rahul Raj, Arun Alat, Joju Sebastian) - 3:17
 "Medapoompattum Chutti" (Najim Arshad) - 1:29
 "Dhadakne De" (Rahul Raj, Najim Arshad) - 2:49

Release
The film was certified by the Central Board of Film Certification on 27 June 2016. Karinkunnam 6'S was released on 6 July 2016 in 49 screens in Kerala on the eve of Eid. The film clashed with the coinciding release of Shajahanum Pareekuttiyum.

Box office

Awards and nominations
Asiavision Awards - 2017
Best Actress - Manju Warrier (shared with Vettah)
Asianet Film Awards
Best Actress - Manju Warrier (shared with Vettah)
Vanitha Film Awards
Best Actress - Manju Warrier (shared with Vettah)
NAFA 2017
Best Actress - Manju Warrier (shared with Vettah)
Filmfare Awards South
Nominated — Best Actress - Manju Warrier (shared with Vettah)

References

External links
 

2016 films
2010s sports drama films
Indian sports drama films
2010s Malayalam-language films
Films scored by Rahul Raj
Films shot in Thiruvananthapuram
Fictional portrayals of the Kerala Police
Indian prison films
2016 drama films